The 12th Pan American Games were held in Mar del Plata, Argentina from March 12 to March 26, 1995.

Medals

Gold

 Men's 5000 meters - Armando Quintanilla
 Men's 10000 meters -Armando Quintanilla
 Men's Marathon - Benjamín Paredes
 Men's 50 kilometer road walk - Carlos Mercenario
 Women's 5000 metres - Adriana Fernandez
 Women's 10000 metre track walk - Graciela Mendoza

 Men's 30m Frontenis - Mexico
 Women's 30m Frontenis - Mexico
 Open 36m Mano Singles - Mexico
 Open 36m Mano Doubles - Mexico
 Open Trinquete Mano - Mexico
 Open Trinquete Mano Doubles - Mexico

 Men's 3m Springboard - Fernando Platas
 Men's 10m Platform - Fernando Platas

 Individual dressage - Patrick Burssens
 Team dressage - Mexico

 Men's Finweight (50 kg) - Carlos Ayala
 Men's Flyweight (54 kg) - Rubén Palafox
 Men's Bantamweight (58 kg) - Rafael Zúñiga
 Men's Middleweight (83 kg) - Víctor Estrada
 Women's Finweight (43 kg) - Liliana Aguirre
 Women's Middleweight (70 kg) - Monica del Real

Silver

 Men's 20 kilometer road walk - Daniel Garcia
 Men's 50 kilometer road walk - 
 Women's 5000 metres - María del Carmen Díaz

 Women's Trinquete Goma - Mexico
 Open 30m Goma - Mexico
 Open 36m Corta - Mexico

 Women's doubles - Georgina Serratos, Gabriela Sandoval
 Women's All-Events - Edda Piccini

 Men's C-1 1000 metres - Juan Martinez
 Men's C-2 500 metres - Mexico
 Women's K-1 500 metres - Erika Duron

 Men's Individual Time Trial (Road) - Jesús Zárate
 Women's 3,000 m Points Race (Track) - Belem Guerrero

 Men's 1m Springboard - Fernando Platas
 Men's 10m Platform - Juan Acosta

 Show jumping - Romandia Jaime Azcarraga
 Team Show jumping - Mexico

 Team - Mexico

 Women's Lightweight coxless pair - Mexico

 Men's Greco-Roman (48 kg) - Enrique Aguilar

Bronze

 Men's Decathlon - Alejandro Cárdenas
 4 x 100 meters relay - Jaime Barragán, Carlos Villaseñor, Salvador Miranda, Alejandro Cárdenas
 Women's 10000 metres - María del Carmen Díaz
 Women's Marathon - Emma Cabrera
 Women's 10000 metre track walk - Francisca Martinez

 Women's Recurve - Marisol Bretón
 Women's Recurve 50 m - Marisol Bretón
 Women's Recurve 60 m - Marisol Bretón
 Women's Recurve 70 m - Marisol Bretón

 Open 36m Cuero - Mexico
 Trinquete Cuero - Mexico

 Men's Singles - Marco Zepeda

 Men's C-1 500 metres - Juan Martinez
 Men's C-2 1000 metres - Mexico
 Women's K-2 500 metres - Mexico

 Women's 1,000 m Sprint (Track) - Nancy Contreras
 Women's 3,000 m Individual Pursuit (Track) - Belem Guerrero Méndez

 Show jumping - Flavier Ximenez

 Women's Individual épée - Yolitzin Martinez

 Women's doubles - Mexico
 Women's team - Mexico

 Men's Lightweight quadruple sculls - Mexico
 Men's Lightweight coxless pair - Mexico
 Women's Lightweight single sculls - Andrea Bradstret
 Women's Lightweight double sculls - Mexico

 Men's  Free Relay - Oscar Sotelo, Nelson Vargas, José Castellanos, Jorge Anaya

 Duet - Wendy Aguilar & Lilian Leal
 Team - Mexico

 Women's Bantamweight (51 kg) - Patricia Mariscal
 Women's Featherweight (55 kg) - Veronica Marquez

 Men's Tricks - Sergio Font
 Women's Jump - Andrea Gaytán

 Greco-Roman (57 kg) - Armando Fernández García
 Greco-Roman (90 kg) - Mario Alberto González

Results by event

References

Nations at the 1995 Pan American Games
P
1995